Beacon Cove is a light rail station in the Melbourne suburb of Port Melbourne located on the former Port Melbourne line, the first significant railway in Australia.

The station used to be called Port Melbourne, and was opened in 1854 to carry passengers arriving at Station Pier to Flinders Street station. The railway line was closed in 1987 to be converted to light rail, currently route 109.

The station building is listed on the Victorian Heritage Register and is located north of Beach Street and to the east of Canberra Parade, having since been converted into a medical centre and cafe to serve the recent residential developments in the area.

Tram services
Yarra Trams operates one route via Beacon Cove station:
 : Box Hill – Port Melbourne

References

External links
 

Victorian Railways Port Melbourne Line Rail Diagram Bridge Street to Piers 1919
Port Melbourne Signal Box 'A' Diagram 1964

Disused railway stations in Melbourne
Railway stations in Australia opened in 1854
Heritage-listed buildings in Melbourne
Railway stations closed in 1987
1987 disestablishments in Australia
Listed railway stations in Australia
Buildings and structures in the City of Port Phillip
Tram stops in Melbourne
Transport in the City of Port Phillip